Pine Lake Park may refer to:

 Pine Lake Park, New Jersey, a community
 Pine Lake Park (San Francisco), a park